Lake Powell is a locality in Victoria, Australia, located approximately 23 km from Robinvale, Victoria.

References 

Towns in Victoria (Australia)
Rural City of Swan Hill
Populated places on the Murray River